Transcription factor PU.1 is a protein that in humans is encoded by the SPI1 gene.

Function 
This gene encodes an ETS-domain transcription factor that activates gene expression during myeloid and B-lymphoid cell development. The nuclear protein binds to a purine-rich sequence known as the PU-box found on enhancers of target genes, and regulates their expression in coordination with other transcription factors and cofactors. The protein can also regulate alternative splicing of target genes. Multiple transcript variants encoding different isoforms have been found for this gene.

The PU.1 transcription factor is essential for hematopoiesis and cell fate decisions. PU.1 can physically interact with a variety of regulatory factors like TFIID, GATA-2, GATA-1 and c-Jun. The protein-protein interactions between these factors can regulate PU.1-dependent cell fate decisions. PU.1 can modulate the expression of 3000 genes in hematopoietic cells including cytokines. It is expressed in monocytes, granulocytes, B and NK cells but is absent in T cells, reticulocytes and megakaryocytes. Its transcription is regulated by various mechanisms .

PU.1 is an essential regulator of the pro-fibrotic system. In fibrotic conditions, PU.1 expression is perturbed in fibrotic diseases, resulting in upregulation of fibrosis-associated genes sets in fibroblasts. Disruption of PU.1 in fibrotic fibroblasts leads to them returning into their resting state from pro-fibrotic fibroblasts. PU.1 is seen to be highly expressed in extracellular matrix producing-fibrotic fibroblasts while it is downregulated in inflammatory/ ECM degrading and resting fibroblasts. The majority of the cells expressing PU.1 in fibrotic conditions remain to be fibroblasts with a few infiltrating lymphocytes. PU.1 induces the polarization of resting and inflammatory fibroblasts into fibrotic fibroblasts.

Structure 
The ETS domain is the DNA-binding module of PU.1 and other ETS-family transcription factors.

Interactions 
SPI1 has been shown to interact with:
 FUS,
 GATA2,
 IRF4, and
 NONO.

References

Further reading

External links 
 

Transcription factors